St Ignatius Church is a parish church of the Roman Catholic Church, located in the town of Wishaw in North Lanarkshire, Scotland. It is within the Diocese of Motherwell. The church building was constructed in 1865, and is a category A listed building. It was designed by George Goldie in a Gothic revival style. The Church now holds about 1100 residents every Saturday and Sunday. Prominent priests since the sixties include Mgr O'Donnell, Fr Trench, Fr McGlinchey, Fr Morris, Canon McGovern.

Clergy 

 Rev. John Black (1859-1860)
 Very Rev. John Canon McCay (1860-1893)
 Rev. Joseph Van Hecke (1893-1927)
 Rt. Rev. Mgr Octavius F. Claeys (1928-1928)
 Very Rev. Thomas Canon Kearney (1929-1966)
 Rt. Rev. Mgr John O'Donnell (1967-1984)
Very Rev. Patrick Canon McGovern (1984-1998)
Rt. Rev. Mgr Michael J. Conway (1998-2012)
Rev. Gerard Maguiness (2012-2020)
Rev. Stephen Rooney (2020-present)

See also
 List of Category A listed buildings in North Lanarkshire 
 List of listed buildings in Motherwell And Wishaw, North Lanarkshire

References

Notes

Sources

External links
The Parish of St.Ignatius of Loyola

1865 establishments in Scotland
Category A listed buildings in North Lanarkshire
wishaw
Buildings and structures completed in 1865
Listed Roman Catholic churches in Scotland
Gothic Revival church buildings in Scotland
Wishaw